Elections to elect the First Punjab Legislative Assembly were held on 26 March 1952. 842 candidates contested for the 105 constituencies in the Assembly. There were 21 two-member constituencies and 84 single-member constituencies.

Results

|- style="background-color:#E9E9E9; text-align:center;"
! class="unsortable" |
! Political party !! Flag !! Seats  Contested !! Won !! % of  Seats !! Votes !! Vote %
|- style="background: #90EE90;"
| 
| style="text-align:left;" |Indian National Congress
| 
| 121 || 96 || 76.19 || 18,30,601 || 36.69
|-
| 
| style="text-align:left;" |Shiromani Akali Dal
| 
| 48 || 13 || 10.32 || 6,20,455 || 12.44
|-
|
| style="text-align:left;" |Zamindar Party
|
| 31 || 2 || 1.59 || 3,72,126 || 7.46
|-
| 
| style="text-align:left;" |Communist Party of India
| 
| 26 || 4 || 3.17 || 1,93,974 || 3.89
|-
| 
| style="text-align:left;" |Forward Bloc (Marxist Group)
|
| 19 || 1 || 0.79 || 69,694 || 1.40
|-
|
| style="text-align:left;" |Lal Communist Party Hind Union
|
| 9 || 1 || 0.79 || 57,739 || 1.16
|-
| 
|
| 446 || 9 || 7.14 || 11,92,896 || 23.91
|- class="unsortable" style="background-color:#E9E9E9"
! colspan = 3| Total seats
! 126 !! style="text-align:center;" |Voters !! 86,23,498 !! style="text-align:center;" |Turnout !! 49,89,077 (57.85%)
|}

Elected members

State Reorganization
On 1 November 1956, under States Reorganisation Act, 1956, Patiala & East Punjab States Union was merged with Punjab. Thus the assembly constituencies were increased from 105 with 126 seats in 1952 to 121 with 154 seats in 1957 elections.

See also

 PEPSU state Legislative Assembly elections, 1952
 1951–52 elections in India
 1957 Punjab Legislative Assembly election

References

Punjab
1952
1952
March 1952 events in Asia